Robert, Bob, or Bobby Bradley may refer to:

Bob Bradley (born 1958), American soccer coach
Bob Bradley (composer) (born 1974), British composer, singer, and songwriter
Bob Bradley (footballer) (1924–1999), Australian rules footballer
Bob Bradley (wrestler), American wrestler
Bobby Bradley (first baseman) (born 1996), American baseball player
Bobby Bradley (pitcher) (born 1980), American baseball player
J. Robert Bradley (1919–2007), American gospel singer
Rob Bradley (born 1970), Florida state senator
Robert B. Bradley, Florida State University administrator
Robert G. Bradley (1921–1944), Navy Cross recipient (posthumous); namesake of USS Robert G. Bradley (FFG-49)
Robert L. Bradley Jr. (born 1955), American historian
Robert Bradley (psychologist) (born 1946), American psychologist

See also
USS Robert G. Bradley (FFG-49), United States Navy frigate
Robert Bradley's Blackwater Surprise, American blues group fronted by Robert Bradley
Bradley method of natural childbirth, obstetrical procedure developed by Dr. Robert A. Bradley